Narrawada is a small historic village located 7 km from Duttalur in Nellore District in Andhra Pradesh, India.

Demography and culture 
The village population is around 1,500. The major occupation of the inhabitants include agriculture and livestock. People predominantly speak Telugu.

References

 TELUGU BAPTIST CHURCH NARRAWADA
 →https://www.google.co.in/maps/place/Narrawada+Telugu+Baptist+Church/@14.9022052,79.4334812,3a,75y,90t/data=!3m8!1e2!3m6!1sAF1QipM_Bie926JC88RHKYmdMYfOKR7dMLR9dRaBnJvD!2e10!3e12!6shttps:%2F%2Flh5.googleusercontent.com%2Fp%2FAF1QipM_Bie926JC88RHKYmdMYfOKR7dMLR9dRaBnJvD%3Dw203-h152-k-no!7i3264!8i2448!4m5!3m4!1s0x3a4b5398f40b3adf:0xc088c8003103d802!8m2!3d14.9022052!4d79.4334812?hl=en&authuser=0#

External links 
Postal code
India map

Villages in Nellore district